Phebe Almira Nebeker Peterson (June 3, 1890 - October 24, 1972) was vice-president of the State Federation of Women's Clubs.

Early life
Phebe Almira Nebeker was born on June 3, 1890, in Laketown, Utah, the daughter of Hyrum Nebeker (1866-1955) and Phebe Almira Hulme (1865-1948).

She attended Brigham Young College and then studied at New England Conservatory of Music in Boston. She graduated from Utah State University.

Career
She was interested in all civic and club affairs. 

She was president of Faculty Women's League. 

She was vice-president of the State Federation of Women's Clubs.

She was a member of U. A. C. Woman's Club, Salt Lake City Friendship Circle and LDS Hospital Board. 

In 1970 she was co-chairman of the Utah State University Endowment campaign.

Personal life
Phebe Nebeker Peterson moved to Logan, Utah, in 1903. She married Elmer George Peterson (1882-1958) and had four children: Marian Peterson Thomas (1915-2003), Elmer George Peterson (1920-1994), Martha Almira Peterson (1923-2004), Chase Nebeker Peterson (1929-2014). She lived at College Hill, Logan, Utah.

She died on October 24, 1972, and is buried at Logan City Cemetery, Logan, Utah.

References

1890 births
1972 deaths
People from Rich County, Utah